Diptirekha Padhi known as Diptirekha  is an Indian Odia playback singer from Bhubaneswar, Odisha. She won the 9th Tarang Music award in 2017.

Career
Diptirekha has mostly worked in many Odia language films as a playback singer. She has also acted as an actress in Tele-Serials such as Raja Kanya, where she was the lead actress. She has lent her voice in films like 4 Idiots, Tu Mo Love Story, Kabula Barabula.She has sung the theme song in voter awareness campaign "My Vote My Country: My Vote not for Sale" for the Odisha Election Watch (OEW).

Discography

Live performances
 Dipti has performed live on Khandagiri Mela in Bhubaneswar on the occasion of ‘Ratha Saptami’.
 She has performed in  the  ‘Dola Yatra’ – the festival of colours at the lawns of India Gate in New Delhi.

References

External links
 
 
 
 

Artists from Bhubaneswar
21st-century Indian singers
Singers from Odisha
Women musicians from Odisha
21st-century Indian women singers
Odia playback singers
Year of birth missing (living people)
Living people